Riverside Park is a park in the LaSalle borough of Montreal, Quebec, Canada. It is bordered by Centrale Street to the south, 35e Avenue to the west, Raymond Street to the east and a school and an adult education centre to the north.

Features
The park features various sports facilities including: swimming pools,  two tennis courts, a baseball field, a basketball court, a Canadian football field, a soccer field, a running track and outdoor ice rinks during the winter.

The park also contains two sports venues, Éloi Viau Stadium and Keith Ewenson Stadium.

Éloi Viau Stadium 
Éloi Viau Stadium is home to Les Cardinals de LaSalle of the Ligue de Baseball Élite du Québec (LBEQ).

References

Parks in Montreal
Baseball in Montreal
LaSalle, Quebec